Francis Marion Wells (1848 - July 22, 1903) was a sculptor active in the San Francisco, California area as a teacher and creator of portrait busts and bas-reliefs, now best remembered for his former Goddess of Progress atop the dome of San Francisco City Hall.

Wells was born in Louisiana and educated in eastern Pennsylvania. He arrived in San Francisco about 1870, where in 1872 he became a charter member of the Bohemian Club. In 1883 he was Douglas Tilden's first teacher, and in 1884 was commissioned for a bust of King Kalākaua of Hawaii, who was visiting Oakland. Although once wealthy, his loan to President Carlos Ezeta of El Salvador went unpaid and left him penniless. He was buried at public expense.

Selected works 

 Goddess of Progress, San Francisco's City Hall
 James Lick relief, Mechanics' Institute
 James Lick relief, Pioneer Hall
 James W. Marshall monument, Sonora County
 Bears, over the entrance to the First National Bank
 Great owl, atop the grand stairway of the Bohemian Club
 Unidentified work at St. Ignatius Church
 Unidentified work at the quadrangle and memorial chapel, Stanford University

References 
 San Francisco Call, July 14, 1903 (California Digital Newspaper Collection)
 Los Angeles Herald, July 23, 1903 (California Digital Newspaper Collection)
 "Artists in California, 1786-1940", Edan Hughes (Askart.com)
 Marquis Who's who in America, Volumes 2-4, Necrology, page lxi, 1906.

1848 births
1903 deaths
Sculptors from California
19th-century American sculptors
19th-century American male artists
American male sculptors